Theodor Danegger (31 August 1891 – 11 October 1959) was an Austrian film actor. He appeared in more than 70 films between 1932 and 1959. He was born in Lienz, Austria and died in Vienna, Austria.

Selected filmography

 Without Witnesses (1919)
 You Don't Forget Such a Girl (1932)
 Voices of Spring (1933)
 Marriage Strike (1935)
 The Royal Waltz (1935)
 Maria Ilona (1939)
 A Hopeless Case (1939)
 Three Fathers for Anna (1939)
 Roses in Tyrol (1940)
 Operetta (1940)
 My Daughter Lives in Vienna (1940)
 Love is Duty Free (1941)
 Much Ado About Nixi (1942)
 Whom the Gods Love (1942)
 Music in Salzburg (1944)
 The Singing House (1948)
 Fregola (1948)
 The Heavenly Waltz (1948)
 The Murder Trial of Doctor Jordan (1949)
 The Blue Straw Hat (1949)
 Royal Children (1950)
 Archduke Johann's Great Love (1950)
 Kissing Is No Sin (1950)
 My Friend the Thief (1951)
  Miracles Still Happen (1951)
 The Mine Foreman (1952)
 1. April 2000 (1952)
 Hanussen (1955)
 Her First Date (1955)
 The Blue Danube (1955)
 Salzburg Stories (1957)
 The Twins from Zillertal (1957)
 Almenrausch and Edelweiss (1957)
 The Count of Luxemburg (1957)

References

External links

1891 births
1959 deaths
Austrian male film actors
Male actors from Vienna
20th-century Austrian male actors